Il Teymur Rural District is in the Central District of Bukan County, West Azerbaijan province, Iran. At the National Census of 2006, its population was 6,302 in 1,060 households. There were 5,519 inhabitants in 1,156 households at the following census of 2011. At the most recent census of 2016, the population of the rural district was 5,215 in 1,633 households. The largest of its 28 villages was Shahrikand, with 705 people.

References 

Bukan County

Rural Districts of West Azerbaijan Province

Populated places in West Azerbaijan Province

Populated places in Bukan County